Figurate erythema  is a form of erythema that presents in a ring or an arc shape.

An example is erythema marginatum.

Classical types include:

 Erythema annulare centrifugum
 Erythema marginatum rheumaticum
 Erythema chronicum migrans
 Erythema gyratum repens

References

Erythemas